Kleppe is a river of North Rhine-Westphalia and of Hesse, Germany. It flows into the Orpe in Marsberg-Canstein.

See also
List of rivers of Hesse
List of rivers of North Rhine-Westphalia

Rivers of Hesse
Rivers of North Rhine-Westphalia
Rivers of Germany